The canton of Grignan is an administrative division of the Drôme department, southeastern France. Its borders were modified at the French canton reorganisation which came into effect in March 2015. Its seat is in Grignan.

It consists of the following communes:
 
La Baume-de-Transit
Bouchet
Chamaret
Chantemerle-lès-Grignan
Colonzelle
Donzère
Les Granges-Gontardes
Grignan
Malataverne
Montbrison-sur-Lez
Montjoyer
Montségur-sur-Lauzon
Le Pègue
Réauville
Roussas
Rousset-les-Vignes
Saint-Pantaléon-les-Vignes
Salles-sous-Bois
Taulignan
Tulette
Valaurie

References

Cantons of Drôme